Hingani is a village in the Karmala taluka of Solapur district in Maharashtra state, India.

Demographics
Covering  and comprising 248 households at the time of the 2011 census of India, Hingani had a population of 1152. There were 611 males and 541 females, with 131 people being aged six or younger.

See also
Hingani Dam

References

Villages in Karmala taluka